Ravi Krishna is a former Indian actor who worked in the Tamil and Telugu film industries. Son of producer A. M. Rathnam, he made his acting debut in Selvaraghavan's critically acclaimed 7G Rainbow Colony. He has won Filmfare Award for Best Male Debut – South for his performance in that movie.

Early life
After his schooling, Ravi Krishna went to London where he pursued a BA degree in Multimedia. He completed his diploma in Interactive communication at Pentamedia, while also concentrating on his career in multimedia with non-linear film editing at Sam Media. He disclosed that he never intended to become an actor, but was "roped in" when he visited India for Easter.

Career
Ravi Krishna's debut film 7G Rainbow Colony, directed by Selvaraghavan and produced by his father fetched him the South Filmfare Award for Best Male Debut of that year, amongst other minor awards. Before starting to shoot for the film, he took a one-month training in acting at the Film Institute in King's College London. Following that, he acted in S. A. Chandrasekhar's Sukran, sharing screen space with fellow actor Vijay, the Radha Mohan-directed family drama Ponniyin Selvan, and the action-masala flick Kedi, under his brother Jyothi Krishna's direction. The films, all produced by his father, received poor reviews and did not do good business at the box office. His first direct Telugu venture Brahmanandam Drama Company was also a box office bomb, with Ravi Krishna lamenting that the film failed to succeed due to poor budgeting and publicity. His next release was the bilingual Netru Indru Naalai / Ninna Nedu Repu and in 2009, he starred in Kadhalna Summa Illai, a partial reshoot of the Telugu film Gamyam. Aaranya Kaandam, termed as the first neo-noir film in Tamil cinema was his last film.

Filmography

References

External links
 

Male actors from Mumbai
Living people
21st-century Indian male actors
Male actors in Telugu cinema
Indian male film actors
Male actors in Tamil cinema
Telugu male actors
Filmfare Awards South winners
Year of birth missing (living people)